Chittagong Press Club is a Chittagong, the second largest city in Bangladesh, based club and association of journalists. Ali Abbas and Chowdhury Farid are respectively the President and General Secretary of club.

History
Chittagong Press Club was established in 1964 by the President of Pakistan, Field Marshal Ayub Khan. In January 2000, the press club and Chittagong Betar Bhaban (radio station) were bombed. The bombing was condemned by Abu Sayeed, State Minister for Information, who blamed the Bangladesh Nationalist Party led opposition.

On 27 July 2008, the Pakistan embassy in Bangladesh donated equipment to the Chittagong Press Club (CPC) Institute of Technology.

On 27 March 2016, the crude bombs were thrown at the Chittagong Press Club.

In March 2020, Chittagong Press Club started offering COVID-19 tests for its members.

References

1964 establishments in East Pakistan
Organisations based in Chittagong
Clubs and societies in Bangladesh
Press clubs
Bangladeshi journalism organisations